The Stretford & Urmston Messenger is a weekly free newspaper delivered to homes in Stretford, Urmston and Davyhulme, in the Metropolitan Borough of Trafford in Greater Manchester, England. Published every Thursday, it is one of two sister Newsquest publications covering Trafford: the other is the Sale & Altrincham Messenger.

References

Citations

Newspapers published by Newsquest